The 1992 United States House of Representatives elections in South Carolina were held on November 6, 1992 to select six Representatives for two-year terms from the state of South Carolina.  The primary elections for the Democrats and the Republicans were held on June 9.  Four incumbents were re-elected, but incumbent Democrat Liz J. Patterson of the 4th congressional district was defeated for re-election by Republican Bob Inglis.  The open seat in the 6th congressional district remained with the Democrats and the composition of the state delegation after the elections was even at three Republicans and three Democrats.

1st congressional district
Incumbent Republican Congressman Arthur Ravenel, Jr. of the 1st congressional district, in office since 1987, defeated Democratic challenger Bill Oberst, Jr.

General election results

|-
| 
| colspan=5 |Republican hold
|-

2nd congressional district
Incumbent Republican Congressman Floyd Spence of the 2nd congressional district, in office since 1971, defeated Libertarian challenger Gebhard Sommer.

General election results

|-
| 
| colspan=5 |Republican hold
|-

3rd congressional district
Incumbent Democratic Congressman Butler Derrick of the 3rd congressional district, in office since 1975, defeated Republican challenger Jim Bland.

General election results

|-
| 
| colspan=5 |Democratic hold
|-

4th congressional district
Incumbent Democratic Congresswoman Liz J. Patterson of the 4th congressional district, in office since 1987, was defeated for re-election by Republican challenger Bob Inglis.

Republican primary

General election results

|-
| 
| colspan=5 |Republican gain from Democratic
|-

5th congressional district
Incumbent Democratic Congressman John M. Spratt, Jr. of the 5th congressional district, in office since 1983, defeated Republican challenger Bill Horne.

Republican primary

General election results

|-
| 
| colspan=5 |Democratic hold
|-

6th congressional district
South Carolina's congressional districts were redrawn following the 1990 census. The Republicans joined forces with the black Democrats in the state legislature to form a black-majority district; this gave the substantial minority the chance to elect candidates they favored. It also made the other districts predominantly majority white by a greater margin, and these conservative voters had been favoring Republicans for some time.

The boundaries of the 6th congressional district were shifted from its previous northeast position in the state to the central part of the state and defined to include many black majority counties, as well as black precincts of Charleston and Columbia. Incumbent Democratic Congressman Robin Tallon opted to retire rather than run in a district that he considered unfavorable to a white candidate.  Jim Clyburn won the Democratic primary and defeated Republican John Chase in the general election to succeed Tallon in office.

Democratic primary

Republican primary

General election results

|-
| 
| colspan=5 |Democratic hold
|-

See also
United States House elections, 1992
United States Senate election in South Carolina, 1992
South Carolina's congressional districts

1992
South Carolina
1992 South Carolina elections